The 1904–05 IPHL season was played by teams of the International Professional Hockey League. It marked the first season in the league’s history. It’s also the only season the Calumet-Laurium Miners won the league title.

Final standings

References
Is Pittsburgh the Birthplace of Professional Hockey? The early years of hockey 1900-1910 Compiled by Ernie Fitzsimmons

International Professional Hockey League seasons
IPHL
IPHL